Leonard Cullen (23 November 1914 – 15 September 1984) was a South African cricketer.  Cullen was a right-handed batsman who bowled right-arm medium pace.  He was born at Johannesburg, Transvaal Province.

Cullen played all his first-class cricket in England for Northamptonshire, making his debut for the county against Middlesex in the 1934 County Championship.  He made seventeen further first-class appearances, the last of which came against Nottinghamshire in the 1935 County Championship.  In his eighteen first-class appearances, he scored 253 runs at an average of 8.43, with a high score of 40.  With the ball, he took 11 wickets at a bowling average of 59.09, with best figures of 3/73.

He died in South Africa on 15 September 1984.

References

External links
Leonard Cullen at ESPNcricinfo
Leonard Cullen at CricketArchive

1914 births
1984 deaths
Cricketers from Johannesburg
South African cricketers
Northamptonshire cricketers